Land usurpation is the appropriation of land from the previous or lawful owner.

References

Theft
Land tenure
Land law